{{DISPLAYTITLE:C9H12N2O3}}
The molecular formula C9H12N2O3 (molar mass: 196.20 g/mol) may refer to: 

 Ethallobarbital, or ethallymal
 5-Nitro-2-propoxyaniline

Molecular formulas